Arthur Lee may refer to:

Arthur Lee (diplomat) (1740–1792), US envoy to France
Arthur Tracy Lee (1814–1879), U.S. Army Colonel, painter, and author
Arthur Lee, 1st Viscount Lee of Fareham (1868–1947), British soldier and diplomat
Arthur Lee (British Army officer) (1877–1954), British Army officer 
Arthur Lee (sculptor) (1881–1961), American sculptor
Arthur Lee (RAF officer) (1894–1975), Royal Air Force Air Vice-Marshal
Arthur Lee (cricketer, born 1913) (1913–1983), English cricketer and judge
Arthur Lee (cricketer, born 1849) (1849–1925), English cricketer and clergyman
Arthur Lee (musician) (1945–2006), American psychedelic-rock musician
Art Lee (born 1947), Canadian politician and lawyer
Arthur Lee (basketball) (born 1977), US-born European basketball player

See also
Arthur Li (born 1945), Hong Kong councillor
Arthur Lees (disambiguation)
Arthur Leigh (died 1638) of the Leigh baronets